The Volok Reform was a 16th-century land reform in parts of the Grand Duchy of Lithuania (Lithuania proper, Duchy of Samogitia and parts of White Ruthenia). The reform was started by Grand Duchess Bona Sforza in her possessions to increase the revenues of the state treasury but soon was expanded statewide and was copied by other nobles and the Church. The reform increased effectiveness of agriculture by establishing a strict three-field system for crop rotation. The land was measured, registered in a cadastre, and divided into voloks (land unit of about ). Volok became the measurement of feudal services. The reform was a success in terms of the annual state revenue that quadrupled from 20,000 to 82,000 kopas of Lithuanian groschens. In social terms, the reform and the accompanying Third Statute of Lithuania (1588), promoted development of manorialism and fully established serfdom in Lithuania which existed until the emancipation reform of 1861. The nobility was clearly separated from the peasants which severely limited social mobility.

Background
The beginnings of serfdom in Lithuania can be traced from the end of the 14th century when Grand Dukes would gift land and peasants, known as veldamai, to Lithuanian nobles for their military service (cf. benefice). The practice was particularly popular during the reign of Vytautas (reigned 1392–1430) and Casimir Jagiellon (reigned 1440–1492). Grand Dukes also issued a series of privileges transferring veldamai further under control of the nobles. That allowed the nobles to establish large estates that had up to a few hundred peasant households (for example, Upninkai and Musninkai of Radvilos). The wealthiest nobles became magnates. According to estimated by Jerzy Ochmański based on the military census of 1528, the magnates (less than 1% of nobility) controlled about 30% of nobility landholdings.

At the same time, there were significant developments in Western Europe. The Age of Discovery and Commercial Revolution shifted the economic initiative from agriculture to trade and industry. Merchants began focusing on importing raw materials and exporting finished goods. As a result, the demand for agricultural products, primarily grain, had increased. That presented an opportunity for the Lithuanian nobles. Their economic activity shifted from military service (taking share of war loot, receiving benefices from Grand Duke) to agriculture (growing and exporting grain to foreign markets). There were significant motivations to expand arable land and ensure cheap and permanent workforce.

Reform 
The reform began in 1547 in the Grand Duke's lands. It was made a law on 1 April 1557 and the process continued until the 1580s.

The Grand Duke was declared the owner of all peasants and their land thereby eliminating any remnants of allodial titles. The nobles that could not prove their noble status or land ownership had their land confiscated and their status reduced to a peasant. The Grand Duke's land was measured, evaluated for quality, and registered in a cadastre. Intruding parcels of land belonging to a noble were moved elsewhere to form a unified tract of land. This tract was then divided.

The land around the manor was assigned to folwark (Grand Duke's farm). Regulations said that each volok of folwark should have seven peasant voloks. Land assigned to peasant farms (the village) was located further from the manor. The surveyors attempted to draw as correct rectangle as possible. Peasant houses were often moved to form a linear settlement along the single road. The peasant land was divided into three equal fields to facilitate the three-field system of crop rotation. Each field was then divided into strips and assigned to each serf household. That way each serf was assigned a strip in each field; the three strips measured one volok (about ). Wealthier serfs with enough manpower were sometimes assigned additional land outside of the designated village; these farms were known as beyond-border. Poorer serfs shared one volok between 2 or 3 families.

Since land was owned by the Grand Duke, peasants had to perform services and pay dues to the landowner in exchange for their use of their farms. The unit of such services was one volok. Initially, a peasant owning one volok had to work 2 days a week in the folwark (corvée), depending on land quality pay between 4 and 24 grosz of feudal land rent, and pay tribute by oats and hay. These feodal services increased significantly during the years.

References

Further reading 
 

Land reform
Serfdom
16th century in Lithuania
Reform in Lithuania